Charles Morley Cunliffe (2 September 1858 – 15 October 1884) was an English amateur cricketer who played for Kent County Cricket Club from  1877 to 1880. Cunliffe was one of Kent's leading slow bowlers of the time but was forced to give up cricket due to ill health. He died at a young age after suffering from tuberculosis.

Early life and family
Cunliffe was born at Leyton in Essex in 1858, the son of Roger and Marion Cunliffe of Tunbridge Wells. His father was a banker in the London bank Roger Cunliffe, Sons and Company which had its origins in 1815 by Cunliffe's ancestor, a Lancashire merchant also named Roger. The firm operated from 24 Bucklersbury and then, from 1867, at 6 Princes Street near the Bank of England.

After prep school, Cunliffe was educated at Rugby School where he was in the cricket XI for three years and established himself as an effective slow bowler.

Cricket career
Cunliffe made his first-class cricket debut for Kent at Tunbridge Wells against Derbyshire in July 1877 at the age of 18 and was originally more prominent as a batsman in county cricket. He became a regular bowler for Kent during the following three seasons, taking five wickets in an innings 11 times, and 10 wickets in a match on three occasions. In 1880 he played in all ten of the county's first-class matches and was the leading bowler of the year, taking 51 wickets at a bowling average of less than 13 runs per wicket.

Considered one of the finest slow bowlers Kent had produced to date, Cunliffe's bowling was described as: "pace very deceptive, with a great curl in the air". Writing in Wisden in 1907 George Marsham, who had watched Cunliffe play, was of the opinion that "even in these days of curlers I have been told that no bowler curled as much as Mr. C. M. Cunliffe" and he was "renowned for his break-back from the pitch" which Lord Harris described as "very puzzling". He played some club cricket for Orleans Club, but did not appear in any of the club's first-class matches, as well as for a range of other teams, including playing against the touring Australians for Hastings Cricket Club in 1878.

Cunliffe played in a total of 25 first-class matches, including two for the amateur Gentlemen of Kent side. He made his final appearance in 1880, playing for Kent against Surrey at The Oval.

Illness and death
Cunliffe was forced to stop playing cricket because of poor health. He suffered from tuberculosis and became progressively unwell. During the 1884 Canterbury Cricket Week Cunliffe is reported to have said: "Well I shan't be here next year but I'd like to be buried in the middle there to make a good bumpy pitch for our bowlers".

He died suddenly at Davos Platz in Switzerland in October 1884 aged 26.

Notes

References

External links

1858 births
1884 deaths
People educated at Rugby School
English cricketers
Kent cricketers
Gentlemen of Kent cricketers
19th-century deaths from tuberculosis
Tuberculosis deaths in Switzerland